Joseph Bates may refer to:
 Joseph Bates (Adventist) (1792–1872),  American seaman and revivalist minister
 Joseph E. Bates (1837–1900), mayor of Denver
 Joe B. Bates (1893–1965), U.S. Representative from Kentucky
 Joseph L. Bates, American photographer in the second half of the 19th century
 Morris Bates (Joseph Morris Bates, 1864–1905), English footballer and founding member of Arsenal Football Club